Official Live 'Leg a.k.a. The Official Live Bootleg is a one-sided live promotional LP by Tom Petty and the Heartbreakers issued by Shelter Records in 1977.  It was recorded at one of the bands' earliest gigs, opening for Al Kooper at Paul's Mall in Boston on December 12, 1976. A remastered vinyl version was included in the deluxe edition of The Live Anthology box set.

Track listing
All songs written by Tom Petty, except "Jaguar and Thunderbird" written by Chuck Berry.

U.S. version (Shelter/ABC TP-12677):
"Jaguar and Thunderbird" – 2:28
"Fooled Again (I Don't Like It)" – 5:17
"Luna" – 4:17
"Dog on the Run" – 9:22

U.K. version (Shelter/Island IDJ-24):
"Jaguar and Thunderbird" – 2:28
"Fooled Again (I Don't Like It)" – 5:17
"The Wild One, Forever" – 4:40
"Luna" – 4:17
"Dog on the Run" – 9:22

Musicians
Tom Petty – guitar, vocals, keyboards on "Luna"
Mike Campbell – lead guitar
Benmont Tench – keyboards, backing vocals
Ron Blair – electric bass guitar
Stan Lynch – drums, backing vocals

Counterfeit version

A counterfeit version that replicates the original album cover but is made to look like a white label promo has been in circulation since the early 1980s.

References

Tom Petty live albums
1977 live albums
Shelter Records live albums